The Guideville Band of Pomo Indians is a Native American tribe of the Pomo Indians of northern California.

History
The tribe's origin is of the original settlers of areas in Mendocino, Lake, and Sonoma counties. 

The tribe currently has 122 members.

Other bands of Pomo include the Lytton Band of Pomo Indians and the Scotts Valley Band of Pomo Indians.

Point Molate Casino Project
In the 2000s, the tribe unsuccessfully attempted to build a Las Vegas-style casino at Point Molate in Contra Costa County.

Notes

Pomo tribe
History of the San Francisco Bay Area
Contra Costa County, California